Iuz the Evil is a sourcebook for the Dungeons & Dragons fantasy role-playing game that describes the realms of the evil demi-god Iuz in the game's World of Greyhawk campaign setting. The sourcebook bears the code WGR5 and was published by TSR in 1993 for the second edition Advanced Dungeons & Dragons rules.

The sourcebook was written by Carl Sargent with cover art by Jeff Easley and interior art by Eric Hotz.  It was designed to supplement Sargent's From the Ashes boxed set for Greyhawk.  Iuz the Evil provides detailed information regarding the Empire of Iuz in the aftermath of the Greyhawk Wars.

References

Further reading
Review: White Wolf #43 (1994)

External links
Iuz the Evil at the TSR Archive

Greyhawk books
Role-playing game supplements introduced in 1993